Acalyptris is a genus of moths of the family Nepticulidae.

Species
Acalyptris acontarcha (Meyrick, 1926)
Acalyptris acumenta (Scoble, 1980) 
Acalyptris amazonius Puplesis & Diškus, 2002
Acalyptris arenosus (Falkovitsh, 1986)
Acalyptris argyraspis Puplesis & Diškus, 1995
Acalyptris articulosus Puplesis & Diškus, 2002
Acalyptris auratilis Puplesis & Diškus, 2003
Acalyptris basihastatus Puplesis & Diškus, 2002
Acalyptris bicornutus (Davis, 1978)
Acalyptris bifidus Puplesis & Robinson, 2000
Acalyptris bipinnatellus (Wilkinson, 1979)
Acalyptris bispinata (Scoble, 1980)
Acalyptris bovicorneus Puplesis & Robinson, 2000
Acalyptris brevis Puplesis, 1990
Acalyptris clinomochla (Meyrick, 1934)
Acalyptris combretella (Vári, 1955)
Acalyptris desertellus (Puplesis, 1984)
Acalyptris distaleus (Wilkinson, 1979)
Acalyptris dividua Puplesis & Robinson, 2000
Acalyptris ecuadoriana Puplesis & Diškus, 2002
Acalyptris egidijui Puplesis, 1990
Acalyptris falkovitshi (Puplesis, 1984)
Acalyptris fagarivora (Vári, 1955)
Acalyptris fortis Puplesis & Robinson, 2000
Acalyptris fulva (Scoble, 1980)
Acalyptris fuscofascia (Scoble, 1980)
Acalyptris galinae (Puplesis, 1984)
Acalyptris gielisi Van Nieukerken, 2010
Acalyptris heteranthes (Meyrick, 1926)
Acalyptris hispidus Puplesis & Robinson, 2000
Acalyptris insolentis Puplesis & Diškus, 2002
Acalyptris kizilkumi (Falkovitsh, 1986)
Acalyptris krooni (Scoble, 1980)
Acalyptris krugeri (Vári, 1963) 
Acalyptris lanneivora (Vári, 1955)
Acalyptris lascuevella Puplesis & Robinson, 2000
Acalyptris latipennata (Puplesis & Robinson, 2000)
Acalyptris laxibasis Puplesis & Robinson, 2000
Acalyptris lesbia van Nieukerken & Hull, 2007
Acalyptris limoniastri van Nieukerken & Hull, 2007
Acalyptris limonii Z. & A. Laštůvka, 1998
Acalyptris loranthella (Klimesch, 1937)
Acalyptris lorantivora (Janse, 1948)
Acalyptris lotella Wagner, 1987
Acalyptris lundiensis (Scoble, 1980) 
Acalyptris lvovskyi (Puplesis, 1984)
Acalyptris mariepsensis (Scoble, 1980) 
Acalyptris maritima A. & Z. Laštůvka, 1997
Acalyptris martinheringi Puplesis & Robinson, 2000
Acalyptris melanospila (Meyrick, 1934)
Acalyptris minimella (Rebel, 1924)
Acalyptris molleivora (Scoble, 1980) 
Acalyptris nigripexus Puplesis & Diškus, 2003
Acalyptris novenarius Puplesis & Robinson, 2000
Acalyptris obliquella (Scoble, 1980) 
Acalyptris onorei Puplesis & Diškus, 2002
Acalyptris pallens (Puplesis, 1984)
Acalyptris paradividua Šimkevičiūtė & Stonis, 2009
Acalyptris piculus Puplesis, 1990
Acalyptris pistaciae van Nieukerken & Hull, 2007
Acalyptris platani (Müller-Rutz, 1934)
Acalyptris platygnathos Puplesis & Robinson, 2000
Acalyptris postalatratus (Wilkinson, 1979)
Acalyptris psammophricta Meyrick, 1921
Acalyptris pseudohastatus Puplesis & Diškus, 2002
Acalyptris punctulata (Braun, 1910)
Acalyptris pundaensis (Scoble, 1980) 
Acalyptris pyrenaica A. & Z. Laštůvka, 1993
Acalyptris repeteki (Puplesis, 1984)
Acalyptris rotundus Puplesis & Diškus, 2002
Acalyptris rubiaevora (Scoble, 1980) 
Acalyptris scirpi (Braun, 1925)
Acalyptris sellata (Scoble, 1980)
Acalyptris shafirkanus (Puplesis, 1984)
Acalyptris staticis (Walsingham, 1908)
Acalyptris tenuijuxtus (Davis, 1978)
Acalyptris terrificus Šimkevičiūtė & Stonis, 2009
Acalyptris thoracealbella (Chambers, 1873)
Acalyptris trifidus Puplesis & Robinson, 2000
Acalyptris turcomanicus (Puplesis, 1984)
Acalyptris umdoniensis (Scoble, 1980) 
Acalyptris unicornis Puplesis & Robinson, 2000
Acalyptris vacuolata (Scoble, 1980) 
Acalyptris vannieukerkeni Puplesis, 1994
Acalyptris vepricola (Vári, 1963) 
Acalyptris vittatus (Puplesis, 1984)
Acalyptris vumbaensis (Scoble, 1980)
Acalyptris yucatani Stonis, Remeikis, Diskus & Noreika, 2013
Acalyptris zeyheriae (Scoble, 1980)

External links
Fauna Europaea
Acalyptris Meyrick: revision of the platani and staticis groups in Europe and the Mediterranean (Lepidoptera: Nepticulidae)

Nepticulidae
Monotrysia genera